Banovac, banski denar or banica is the name of a coin struck and used in Croatia between 1235 and 1384. The Latin name  was derived from the words ban and denarius. The word ban is a title of nobility used in Croatia, and roughly translates as "viceroy", whereas denarius is Latin for coins minted by the Roman Empire.

Banovac included the image of a marten - due to the fact that marten pelts were highly valued goods used as a form of payment in Slavonia, the Croatian Littoral, and Dalmatia. This was one of the reasons for naming the current currency of the Republic of Croatia the kuna. The coins were first minted in Pakrac, and from 1260 in Zagreb.

The legends are:
 MONETA REGIS P SCLAVONIA (common)
 MONETA B REGIS P SCLAVONIA (moneta Belae regis pro sclavonia, scarce)
 MONETA DVCIS P SCLAVONIA (scarce)
 MONETA REGIS P VNGARIA (rare)

Initials on the Árpád Dynasty coins are:
 King Bela IV (1235–1270):
 o - o,
 lily - lily,
 bird - bird,
 h - R (Ban Henricus Nemetujvari, 1267–1270)
 King Stephen V (1270–1272)
 S - R (Stephanus Rex),
 R - S (Rex Stephanus)
 King Ladislaus IV (1272–1290)
 R - L (Rex Ladislaus),
 L - R (Ladislaus Rex),
 S - L (Ban Stephanus Babonich - Rex Ladislaus, 1280-1282?),
 R - R - L (Ban Radoszlav - Rex Ladislaus, 1286–1288)
 King Andrew III (1290–1301)
 R - A (Rex Andreas),
 A - R (Andreas Rex),
 S - A (Ban Stephanus Babonich - Rex Andreas, 1300–1301),
 R - bird (Rex Andreas - Ban Stephanus Babonich, 1300–1301),
 A - bird (Rex Andreas - Ban Stephanus Babonich, 1300–1301)

See also 

 marturina
 Dinar
 Croatian kuna

External links 
 http://www.hr/croatia/economy/money/history
 https://web.archive.org/web/20061022035043/http://www.hnb.hr/novcan/povijest/h-nastavak-3.htm 

13th century in Croatia
Coins
Medieval currencies
14th century in Croatia